The Millennium Dance Complex is a dance studio founded in 1992 and located in the NOHO Arts District of Los Angeles until 2016, when it moved to Studio City. Dance Teacher magazine called Millennium "...one of the top schools in the country." Millennium offers daily drop-in classes in jazz dance, hip-hop, tap, and contemporary dance. Millennium is best known for its numerous dance videos with millions of views on their YouTube channel. Performers such as Britney Spears, Janet Jackson, Justin Timberlake, Usher, Jennifer Lopez, Christina Aguilera, Kenny Ortega, P. Diddy, Beyoncé, Samuel, Monsta X, NCT 127  Ateez and Boy Story have taken classes or had rehearsals at the studio.

In 1988, Millennium's directors, AnnMarie Hudson and Robert Baker, met in Frank Hatchett's jazz-funk class on Broadway in Manhattan, New York City. AnnMarie had sold her small New Jersey dance school and relocated to New York. Her first job was in management at the newly formed Broadway Dance Center, working for its founder, Richard Elner. Robert had moved to New York City from South Carolina to pursue a career in acting and dance. He was with the original cast of Dreamgirls on Broadway and studied screenwriting at New York University.

In 1991, they moved to Los Angeles where Robert began to work in the television industry as a producer and AnnMarie started Millennium under the name Moro Landis Studios because of the historical dance building which it occupied. In 1999, after producing television movies for NBC, ABC, and securing a producing deal at Warner Brothers television, Robert joined AnnMarie in moving the dance center to its present location. Shortly after, he switched his career goal to building and expanding Millennium with AnnMarie. He remained for nearly 10 years. Millennium's faculty is composed of today’s top working choreographers including Marty Kudelka, David Moore, Matt Steffanina, Tricia Miranda, Brian Friedman, Kyle Hanagami and many more.

Branches

United States of America
 Los Angeles, California
 Orange County, California
 Las Vegas, Nevada
 Miami, Florida
 Nashville, Tennessee
 Salt Lake City, Utah
 Denver, Colorado

Asia
 Shanghai, China
 Beijing, China

Europe
 Cologne, Germany

South America
 São Paulo, Brazil

References

External links

Music venues in Los Angeles
Event venues established in 1992